Lipkovo is a village in North Macedonia. It is the seat of Lipkovo Municipality.

History 

According to the statistics of the Bulgarian ethnographer Vasil Kanchov from 1900, 490 inhabitants lived in Lipkovo, 250 Muslim Albanians and 240 Bulgarian Exarchists. 

Lipkovo was a central strategic village during the 2001 armed conflict between the Albanian National Liberation Army and the Macedonian Army. Today, it has a dam which supplies water and electricity to the Kumanovo region.

Demographics
As of the 2021 census, Lipkovo had 2,138 residents with the following ethnic composition:
Albanians 2,104
Persons for whom data are taken from administrative sources 32
Others 2

According to the 2002 census, the town had a total of 2644 inhabitants. Ethnic groups in the village include:
Albanians 2631
Macedonians 2
Others 11

Sister Towns 

  Mustafakemalpaşa, the main town of Bursa Province in the Marmara region of Turkey.

References

External links
 Municipal flag of Lipkovo

Villages in Lipkovo Municipality
Albanian communities in North Macedonia